The 1987–88 QMJHL season was the 19th season in the history of the Quebec Major Junior Hockey League. Ten teams played 70 games each in the schedule. Patrice Lefebvre of the Shawinigan Cataractes becomes the last player in Canadian Hockey League history to record a 200-point season. The Hull Olympiques finished first overall in the regular season, winning their second Jean Rougeau Trophy, and won their second President's Cup, defeating the Drummondville Voltigeurs in the finals.

Team changes
 The Longueuil Chevaliers relocate to Victoriaville, Quebec, becoming the Victoriaville Tigres, switching to the Dilio Division.
 The Granby Bisons switch to the Lebel Division.

Final standings
Note: GP = Games played; W = Wins; L = Losses; T = Ties; Pts = Points; GF = Goals for; GA = Goals against

complete list of standings.

Scoring leaders
Note: GP = Games played; G = Goals; A = Assists; Pts = Points; PIM = Penalties in minutes

 complete scoring statistics

Playoffs
Marc Saumier was the leading scorer of the playoffs with 48 points (17 goals, 31 assists).

Division semifinals
 Shawinigan Cataractes defeated Chicoutimi Saguenéens 4 games to 2.
 Drummondville Voltigeurs defeated Victoriaville Tigres 4 games to 1.
 Hull Olympiques defeated Granby Bisons 4 games to 1.
 Laval Titan defeated Saint-Jean Castors 4 games to 3.

Division Finals
 Drummondville Voltigeurs defeated Shawinigan Cataractes 4 games to 1.
 Hull Olympiques defeated Laval Titan 4 games to 3.

Finals
 Hull Olympiques defeated Drummondville Voltigeurs 4 games to 3.

All-star teams
First team
 Goaltender – Stéphane Beauregard, Saint-Jean Castors
 Left defence – Yves Racine, Victoriaville Tigres  
 Right defence – Éric Desjardins, Granby Bisons 
 Left winger – Martin Gélinas, Hull Olympiques
 Centreman – Marc Saumier, Hull Olympiques  
 Right winger – Patrice Lefebvre, Shawinigan Cataractes   
 Coach – Alain Vigneault, Hull Olympiques 
Second team
 Goaltender – Jason Glickman, Hull Olympiques   
 Left defence – Éric Tremblay, Drummondville Voltigeurs  
 Right defence – Steve Veilleux, Trois-Rivières Draveurs
 Left winger – Yves Gaucher, Chicoutimi Saguenéens
 Centreman – Stéphan Lebeau, Shawinigan Cataractes
 Right winger – Patrice Tremblay, Chicoutimi Saguenéens
 Coach – Guy Chouinard, Victoriaville Tigres
 List of First/Second/Rookie team all-stars.

Trophies and awards
Team
President's Cup – Playoff Champions, Hull Olympiques
Jean Rougeau Trophy – Regular Season Champions, Hull Olympiques
Robert Lebel Trophy – Team with best GAA, Saint-Jean Castors

Player
Michel Brière Memorial Trophy – Most Valuable Player, Marc Saumier, Hull Olympiques
Jean Béliveau Trophy – Top Scorer, Patrice Lefebvre, Shawinigan Cataractes  
Guy Lafleur Trophy – Playoff MVP, Marc Saumier, Hull Olympiques 
Jacques Plante Memorial Trophy – Best GAA, Stéphane Beauregard, Saint-Jean Castors
Emile Bouchard Trophy – Defenceman of the Year, Éric Desjardins, Granby Bisons  
Mike Bossy Trophy – Best Pro Prospect, Daniel Doré, Drummondville Voltigeurs 
Michel Bergeron Trophy – Offensive Rookie of the Year, Martin Gélinas, Hull Olympiques 
Raymond Lagacé Trophy – Defensive Rookie of the Year, Stéphane Beauregard, Saint-Jean Castors 
Frank J. Selke Memorial Trophy – Most sportsmanlike player, Stéphan Lebeau, Shawinigan Cataractes 
Marcel Robert Trophy – Best Scholastic Player, Stéphane Beauregard, Saint-Jean Castors

See also
1988 Memorial Cup
1988 NHL Entry Draft
1987–88 OHL season
1987–88 WHL season

References
 Official QMJHL Website
 www.hockeydb.com/

Quebec Major Junior Hockey League seasons
QMJHL